Petrophile circinata is a species of flowering plant in the family Proteaceae and is endemic to southwestern Western Australia. It is a low, spreading shrub with pinnately-divided, sharply-pointed leaves, and more or less spherical heads of hairy, white, yellow or cream-coloured flowers.

Description

Taxonomy
Petrophile circinata was first formally described in 1855 by Carl Meissner in Hooker's Journal of Botany and Kew Garden Miscellany from an unpublished description by Richard Kippist. The type specimens were collected by James Drummond. The specific epithet (circinata) means "rounded".

Distribution and habitat
This petrophile grows in low shrubland, scrub and heath between Pingelly, Boorabbin, Lake Grace and Lake King in the Avon Wheatbelt, Coolgardie, Esperance Plains, Jarrah Forest and Mallee biogeographic regions of southwestern Western Australia.

Conservation status
Petrophile circinata is classified as "not threatened" by the Western Australian Government Department of Parks and Wildlife.

References

circinata
Eudicots of Western Australia
Endemic flora of Western Australia
Plants described in 1855